Nada Gordon (born 1964) is an American poet. She is a pioneer of Flarf poetry and a founding member of the Flarf Collective.

Life
Nada Gordon was born in 1964 in Oakland, California. Gordon was a precocious poet, exposed to poetry early by parents who both wrote poetry, she remembers dictating poems to her mother at seven. Her junior high school poetry teacher was Cole Swensen. While still in her teens, she taught a poetry workshop at the Berkeley YWCA.

In 1988, she emigrated to Japan. There she taught English, performed vocals for the band IRO and co-edited the magazine AYA. In 1999, she returned to the US and settled in Brooklyn.

Education
In her late teens, Gordon took a classes at San Francisco State University, working  with  Kathleen Fraser, Stephen Rodefer, and Barrett Watten. Fraser's curriculum included talks with visiting writers and through these Gordon was exposed to Carla Harryman, Steve Benson, Anne Rice, Lyn Hejinian.

She received an MA in Literature at UC Berkeley, completing her thesis on poet Bernadette Mayer in 1986.

Work
In 2000, Gordon, along with Gary Sullivan, Mitch Highfill, Drew Gardner and K Silem Mohammad began the practice that resulted in the creation of the Flarf movement, submitting intentionally atrocious poems to the website Poetry.com, which had scammed Sullivan's father, to see if the vanity press would draw the line at publishing their compositions.

Awards
 2014, Stacy Doris Memorial Poetry Award

List of works
Poetry collections
 Vile Lilt  (Roof Books, 2013) 
 Scented Rushes (Roof Books, 2010)
 Folly (Roof Books, 2007)
 V. Imp (Faux Pr, 2002) 
 Foriegnn Bodie (Detour Press, 2001) 
 Swoon (Granary) (Granary Books, 2001)
 Are Not Our Lowing Heifers Sleeker Than Night-Swollen Mushrooms? (Spuyten Duyvil, 2001)

References

External links
Form's Life: An Exploration of the Works of Bernadette Mayer by Nada Gordon.

1964 births
Living people
21st-century American poets
20th-century American poets
21st-century American women writers
20th-century American women writers
American women poets
Writers from Oakland, California
Poets from California
University of California, Berkeley alumni
San Francisco State University alumni